The Government Securities Act, 2006 is a legislation of the Parliament of India, which aims to introduce various improvements in the government securities market and the management of government securities by the Reserve Bank of India (RBI).

History
The Public Debt Act, 1944 was an act of the Parliament of India which provided a legal framework for the issuance and servicing of government securities in India. It was considered outdated, and the Government Securities Act, 2006 was introduced to replace it. The Act oversees government securities and their management by the Reserve Bank of India. The second clause of Section 2 defines government securities as a securities issued by the central or a state government for the purpose of raising a public loan.

See also
 Banking in India
 Public debt
 Banking Regulation Act, 1949

References

Further reading
 

Acts of the Parliament of India 2006
Banking in India
Government finances in India
Government debt
Financial history of India